Frank Funaro is an American drummer who has played with Del Lords, The Brandos, Camper Van Beethoven, Joey Ramone, The Dictators, Cracker, Nils Lofgren & Dion DiMucci.

Funaro collaborated with Joey Ramone on his first solo record Don't Worry About Me on four tracks.

In 1994, Funaro accompanied former Del Lords member Scott Kempner and legendary vocalist Dion DiMucci to form the Little Kings.

Funaro joined the lineup of his current band, Cracker, in 1998. Funaro replaced prior touring drummer Johnny Hott after the release of Cracker's album The Golden Age in 1996.

References

1958 births
Living people
The Del-Lords members
20th-century American drummers
American male drummers
Camper Van Beethoven members
Cracker (band) members
The Dictators members
20th-century American male musicians
The Brandos members